The Congregation of the Sisters of the Imitation of Christ (SIC)  or Bethany Madhom is a congregation in the Syro-Malankara Catholic Church. It was founded by the Servant of God Archbishop Geevarghese Mar Ivanios on 1 May 1925, originally in the Malankara Orthodox Church. The whole congregation re-united with the Catholic Church in 1930 following the reunion movement.

The Bethany Sisters are the female counterpart of the Order of the Imitation of Christ (Bethany Ashram), which was founded by Mar Ivanios in 1919.

External links

Syro-Malankara Catholic Church
1925 establishments in India